Spot Mountain is a  mountain summit located in the Two Medicine area of Glacier National Park, in Glacier County, Montana, United States. It is situated in the Lewis Range, nine miles northwest of East Glacier Park Village, and approximately five miles east of the Continental Divide. Precipitation runoff from the mountain drains into tributaries of Cut Bank Creek and Two Medicine River, which merge to form the Marias River. The mountain's name was officially adopted in 1929 by the United States Board on Geographic Names.

Geology 

The mountains in Glacier National Park are composed of sedimentary rock laid down during the Precambrian to Jurassic periods.

Climate 
According to the Köppen climate classification system, Spot Mountain is located in an alpine subarctic climate zone with long, cold, snowy winters, and cool to warm summers. Winter temperatures can drop below −10 °F with wind chill factors below −30 °F. Due to its altitude, it receives precipitation all year, as snow in winter, and as thunderstorms in summer.

Gallery

See also

 Mountains and mountain ranges of Glacier National Park (U.S.)
 Geology of the Rocky Mountains

References

External links 
 Weather forecast: Spot Mountain

Mountains of Glacier County, Montana
Mountains of Glacier National Park (U.S.)
Lewis Range
Mountains of Montana
North American 2000 m summits